Kadavur  taluk is a taluk of Karur district of the Indian state of Tamil Nadu. The headquarters of the taluk is the town of Thargampatti. There are 23 revenue villages under this taluk.

Demographics
According to the 2011 census, the taluk of Kadavur had a population of 109,810 with 54,852  males and 54,958 females. There were 1002 women for every 1000 men. The taluk had a literacy rate of 57.85. Child population in the age group below 6 was 6,130 Males and 5,747 Females.

References

External links 
 TNGIS

Taluks of Karur district